Ctenophorus cristatus, commonly known as the crested dragon, bicycle dragon or crested bicycle-dragon, is a species of agamid lizard occurring in semi-arid woodlands in south-western Australia.

References

Agamid lizards of Australia
cristatus
Endemic fauna of Australia
Reptiles described in 1841
Taxa named by John Edward Gray